Camillina pulchra is a species of ground spider in the family Gnaphosidae. It is found in Brazil, Argentina, and has been introduced into the United States.

References

Gnaphosidae
Articles created by Qbugbot
Spiders described in 1891